Lurgan railway station serves Lurgan in County Armagh, Northern Ireland.

History 

The station opened on 18 November 1841. In 1972, the original Great Northern Railway station building was destroyed by a paramilitary bomb, and subsequently the current station building was erected.

Service 
Extra services run at peak times, and the service reduces to hourly operation in the evenings.

On Sundays there is an hourly service in each direction. There is also a Sunday-only Enterprise service with one morning train to Dublin Connolly.

References

External links 
 

Railway stations in County Armagh
Railway stations served by NI Railways
Railway stations served by Enterprise
Lurgan
Railway stations in Northern Ireland opened in 1841